Kolebira Assembly constituency   is an assembly constituency in  the Indian state of Jharkhand.

Members of Assembly 

★Bye Elections

Election Results

2019

2018 Bypoll

See also
Simdega district
Kolebira block
Vidhan Sabha
List of states of India by type of legislature

References

Assembly constituencies of Jharkhand